is a fictional character in the 2000 video game Final Fantasy IX, where she is one of the main characters.

Concept and creation
Freya was created for the 2000 video game Final Fantasy IX. She was initially known as Freija. She is a member of a race of anthropomorphic rats called Burmecians who mainly live in two cities, Burmecia and Cleyra. Her class is Dragon Knight. The original concept art for Freya was created by Yoshitaka Amano, and the final version was created by Toshiyuki Itahana, as well as Shunkou Murase and Shin Nagasawa, who also handled the in-game version of the character. Her character design was meant to strike a balance between realism and a comic-like style, while taking inspiration from the style employed for the characters in the film The Dark Crystal.

Appearances
Freya appears in the video game Final Fantasy IX. She is originally from Burmecia, but when met in the game, she has not been home for years. When the man she loved, Sir Fratley, left on a mission but never returned, she left home until she discovered what became of him. After a period in Lindblum, she headed out to wander the world. Freya returns to Lindblum to compete in the "Festival of the Hunt" around the same time that Zidane and Tantalus return from their mission to kidnap Princess Garnet. Freya is reunited with Sir Fratley during Alexandria's attack on Cleyra. Her joy is cut short when he reveals that he has lost his memory and does not remember her at all. Freya is crestfallen, but when Fratley leaves again, she says nothing. She explains that she was just happy that he was alive. She is reunited with Fratley during the ending of the game in Burmecia. He has not regained his memories, but he falls back in love with Freya.

A figurine of Freya was released in a compilation with Beatrix in February 2020.

Reception
Freya has received generally positive reception, regarded as a fan favorite by Keegan Lee of RPGFan. Jef Rouner of the Houston Press ranked her among the most attractive furry characters, calling her one of his favorite Final Fantasy IX characters. He called her one of the most "romantic" characters on his list due to her "pale colors, tragic stoicism and the shock of emo hair that obscures most pictures of her". Anthony John Agnello of GamesRadar+ calls her "Jim Hensonian", noting her "warm" mixture of human and animal traits. Developer Robert Boyd regarded her as one of the best female warriors in Japanese role-playing games. Brittany Vincent of SyFy Wire called it a "veritable crime" that Freya was absent from the Dissidia Final Fantasy franchise, calling her "awesome" and noted that she needed "more time in the spotlight". Richard Walls of Video Game Music Online noted how her musical theme captured her insecurities and solitude well and how it progressed to being more heroic as it progresses. He called it the "deepest musical portraits of any character" that composer Nobuo Uematsu had ever made. Julian Whitney, also of Video Game Music Online, similarly discussed her theme, noting its melancholy and sense of hope. They called the theme the standout of the soundtrack, citing Freya's "courage and perseverance".

Joshua Carpenter of RPGamer praised her, noting her quest as a standout aspect of the game. However, Shaun Musgrave of TouchArcade felt that Freya was "completely squandered" in Final Fantasy IX. Nadia Oxford of USGamer felt similar, noting that she loves Dragoons and rodent-type characters, which made her feel disappointed in her lack of development. She also called her "the best" and showed appreciation for the fact that she is a positive depiction of rats. Steven Toast of RPGamer disagreed on her development, thinking she was handled well. He praised how she has a stronger side while having her softer, romantic side. Colin Stevens of Hardcore Gamer noted that despite Freya's design hearkening back to old Final Fantasy classes, the writers subvert expectations of these classes by giving them more development than people may have expected.

References

Anthropomorphic video game characters
Anthropomorphic mice and rats
Female characters in video games
Fictional explorers in video games
Fictional knights in video games
Final Fantasy characters
Final Fantasy IX
Square Enix protagonists
Video game characters introduced in 2000
Woman soldier and warrior characters in video games